Alkalicoccus urumqiensis is a Gram-positive, rod-shaped, moderately haloalkaliphilic and aerobic bacterium from the genus of Alkalicoccus.

References

Bacillaceae
Bacteria described in 2016